Mylothris continua is a butterfly in the family Pieridae. It is found in Cameroon, the Republic of the Congo, the Democratic Republic of the Congo, Uganda, Kenya and Tanzania. The habitat consists of dense primary forests.

Adults have a slow flight and keep to the semi-shade of the forest. Occasionally they venture into forest clearings to feed at flowers.  They have been observed mud-puddling.

Subspecies
Mylothris continua continua (Democratic Republic of the Congo, Uganda, western Kenya, north-western Tanzania)
Mylothris continua maxima Berger, 1981 (Cameroon, Republic of the Congo, western Democratic Republic of the Congo)

References

Butterflies described in 1944
Pierini